The Canadian Screen Award for Best Cinematography in a Documentary is an annual award, presented as part of the Canadian Screen Awards program to honour the year's best cinematography in a documentary film. It is presented separately from the Canadian Screen Award for Best Cinematography for feature films.

On two prior occasions, at the 1st Genie Awards in 1980 and at the shortlived Bijou Awards in 1981, awards were presented for Best Cinematography in a Documentary (Non-Feature), covering short documentaries and television programs, but not for feature documentaries. Nonetheless, the winners and nominees in those years have been included below. In the 1960s, both short and feature documentary films were sometimes winners of the Canadian Film Award for Best Cinematography, as relatively few Canadian narrative features were made in that era, but this was not continued after 1969.

1980s

2010s

2020s

See also
Prix Iris for Best Cinematography in a Documentary

References

Cinematography in a Documentary
Canadian documentary film awards